Öblarn is a municipality in the district of Liezen in Styria, Austria. It is a small mountain village in the Eastern Alps.

References

Cities and towns in Liezen District